The Wilerhorn is a mountain of the Bernese Alps, overlooking Wiler and in the canton of Valais. It lies west of the Bietschhorn, on the range separating the Lötschental from the main Rhone valley. It should not be confused with the Wilerhorn that is in the canton of Bern but the Emmental Alps.

References

External links
 Wilerhorn on Hikr

Mountains of the Alps
Alpine three-thousanders
Mountains of Switzerland
Mountains of Valais
Bernese Alps